The Temblor Formation is a geologic formation in California. It preserves fossils dating back from the Late Oligocene to the Middle Miocene of the Neogene period. It is notable for the famous Sharktooth Hill deposit (otherwise known as Ernst Quarry).

Fossils

Vertebrates

Cartilagenous fishes

Sharks 

 Carcharias
 Cephaloscyllium
 Cetorhinus
 †Carcharocles megalodon 
 †Galeocerdo aduncus
 †Hemipristis serra
 Heterodontus
 Hexanchus
 †Isurus desori
 †Isurus hastalis 
 †Isurus planus
 Megachasma
 Notorhynchus
 †Parotodus benedenii
 Scyliorhinus
 Squalus 
 Squatina

Rays and skates 
 Dasyatis
 Myliobatis

Reptiles 

 Pacifichelys
 †Chelonia californiensis
 †Syllomus aegyptiacus

Birds 
 †Diomedea californica
 †D. milleri
 †Fulmarus miocaenus
 †Hadrogyps aigialerus
 †Megalodytes morejohni
 †Morus vagabundus
 †Osteodontornis orri
 †Pandion homalopteron
 †Presbychen abavus
 †Puffinus inceptor
 †P. milleri
 †P. priscus

Mammals 
 †Allodesmus kernensis
 †Bouromeryx americanus
 †Hypohippus
 †Miotapirus
 †Paleoparadoxia tabatai
 †Paratomarctus temerarius
 †Pelagiarctos thomasi
 †Aulophyseter morricei
 †Oedolithax mira
 †Loxolithax sinuosa
 †Parietobalaena securis

See also 

 
 List of fossiliferous stratigraphic units in California
 Paleontology in California

References

External links 
 

Geologic formations of California
Neogene stratigraphic units of North America
Shale formations of the United States
Miocene California
Paleogene California
Geology of Kern County, California
Geography of the San Joaquin Valley
Paleontology in California
Temblor Range